Boolburra is a rural town and locality in the Central Highlands Region, Queensland, Australia.

History 
Boolburra Provisional School opened on 31 August 1874. On 1 January 1909 it became Boolburra State School. It closed on 22 April 1926.

Education 
There are no schools in Boolburra. The nearest government primary schools are Gogango State School in neighbouring Gogango to the east and Duaringa State School in neighbouring Duaringa to the west. There are no nearby secondary schools; the options are distance education and boarding school.

References

External links 
 

Towns in Queensland
Central Highlands Region
Localities in Queensland